24th meridian may refer to:

24th meridian east, a line of longitude east of the Greenwich Meridian
24th meridian west, a line of longitude west of the Greenwich Meridian